Heart Like a River is the 6th studio album by American indie rock duo Ida, released in 2005 on Polyvinyl Records.

Reception 

Critical reception for Heart Like a River varied from mildly favorable to very favorable, but all agreed that it was of a piece with their previous work. The album "...brings serene harmonies to songs about longtime love as well as romances that don't go so smoothly," according to Jon Pareles, writing in The New York Times.

Track listing
All tracks written by Littleton/Mitchell, except "What Can I Do" and "Honeyslide" by Karla Schickele.

"Laurel Blues" — 4:50
"599" — 5:29
"Late Blues" — 5:24
"Mine" — 5:31
"What Can I Do" — 2:57
"The Details" — 4:38
"Sundown" — 6:42
"Honeyslide" — 3:37
"Written on My Face" — 3:50
"The Morning" — 7:31
"Forgive" — 7:31

Personnel
 Daniel Littleton - guitar, harmonium, organ, viola, drums, vocals
 Elizabeth Mitchell - guitar, harmonium, accordion, wurlitzer, vocals
 Karla Schickele - bass, piano, bell, vocals
 Luther Gray - drums, percussion, clarinet
 Jean Cook - violin
 Cecilia Littleton - viola
 Rick Lassiter - double bass
 Dominique Davison - cello
 Andrew Hall - double bass

References 

2005 albums
Ida (band) albums